Gaelic Park is a multi-purpose outdoor athletics facility, located at West 240th Street and Broadway in Riverdale, Bronx, in New York City in the U.S. state of New York. Since 1926 the grounds has been used as the venue for Gaelic games in New York, and since its purchase by Manhattan College in 1991 it has hosted numerous American college athletic events.

Located just west of Broadway and south and west of Van Cortlandt Park in the northernmost part of the Bronx just south of the city border with Westchester County, Gaelic Park was purchased in 1926 by the Gaelic Athletic Association of Greater New York. It has been given a few different names over time including Innisfail Park, but since the 1950s it has gone by its current name, Gaelic Park, a reflection of the park's decidedly Irish flavor. The park includes a playing field and dance hall. In addition to hurling and football matches, a number of other sporting events take place at Gaelic Park. There are also concerts and dances that feature Irish music both old and new.

History
Gaelic Park was bought by the Gaelic Athletic Association of Greater New York (GAA) in 1926. It started off as a very rough pitch that served as a social center for the many Irish immigrants to The Bronx. With the absence of film centers and other entertainment complexes, hurling at the park was the main entertainment.

The GAA ran the park for about 10 years until it was forced into bankruptcy, after which the city took over the land. The property was then leased again in 1941 to John "Kerry" O’Donnell, who with the help of his family and friends ran the park, dance hall, and tavern. For several years, it was called "Croke Park" after the main GAA stadium in Dublin.

The Grateful Dead performed in Gaelic Park on August 26, 1971, to a crowd of 15,000 fans. It would be the last time the band would perform in their original quintet configuration of Jerry, Phil, Pig, Billy and Bobby.

The park was taken over by Manhattan College in 1991. The college has kept up the traditions of Gaelic Park, as well as doing some significant renovations, and now also uses it for home games of lacrosse, rugby, soccer, and softball.

In early 2007, a $3 million renovation of Gaelic Park began. FieldTurf was laid out to replace the natural pitch, which made it more durable for both American and Gaelic sports. In addition, facilities for softball were improved, and the installation of stadium lighting made night games possible.

In April 2019, the banquet hall of Gaelic Park was torn down and replaced with support from the GAA, the Irish Department of Foreign Affairs, and other donations and sponsors.

New York did not compete in the 2020 and 2021 Connacht Senior Football Championship (a precursor to the 2020 and 2021 Senior All Ireland Football Championships) due to Covid-19 travel restrictions, but returned to competition in 2022 with a first round home game at Gaelic Park against Sligo on Sunday 17 April.

Rugby

See also
 List of Gaelic Athletic Association stadiums

References

External links
 Gaelic Park

1926 establishments in New York City
College football venues
College lacrosse venues in the United States
College soccer venues in the United States
College softball venues in the United States
Gaelic games grounds
Irish-American culture in New York City
Lacrosse venues in New York City
Major League Rugby stadiums
Manhattan Jaspers football
New York GAA
Riverdale, Bronx
Rugby union stadiums in New York City
Rugby New York stadiums
Soccer venues in New York City
Softball venues in New York City
Sports venues completed in 1926
Sports venues in the Bronx